The West Branch of the Souhegan River is a  river in southern New Hampshire in the United States. It is a tributary of the Souhegan River, which flows to the Merrimack River and ultimately to the Gulf of Maine.

The West Branch is located entirely in the town of New Ipswich, New Hampshire. It begins at the junction of Fox Brook and Pratt Pond Brook, southwest of the town center, and flows east through the settlement known as Smithville, ending at its junction with the South Branch of the Souhegan River north of Gibson Four Corners.

See also

List of rivers of New Hampshire

References

Tributaries of the Merrimack River
Rivers of New Hampshire
Rivers of Hillsborough County, New Hampshire